Steven John Bator (October 22, 1949 – June 4, 1990), known professionally as Stiv Bator and later as Stiv Bators, was an American punk rock vocalist and guitarist from Girard, Ohio. He is best remembered for his bands Dead Boys and The Lords of the New Church.

Early life 
Stiv Bators was born Steven John Bator on October 22, 1949, in Youngstown, Ohio (some sources say Cleveland), to Mr and Mrs. Steven John Bator Sr. He was of Pennsylvania Dutch and Czech-Romani descent; "Stiv" is the Czech equivalent to Steven. He was in Catholic school for 12 years.

Music and film career 
In the course of his career Bators was involved with a variety of bands beyond those for which he was best known, including Hormones, with Dennis Comeau and Andre Siva, Frankenstein, The Wanderers and The Whores of Babylon (with Dee Dee Ramone and Johnny Thunders). He also recorded as a solo artist with Bomp! Records.

As the lead singer and driving force of the Cleveland, Ohio–based Dead Boys, Bators helped pioneer the punk rock sound, look and attitude. The band quickly became a popular staple at CBGB, a music club in New York City's  East Village. The Dead Boys were featured in the punk rock films Punking Out (1978), Live at CBGB's (1977) and Crash 'n' Burn (1977).

Following the demise of Dead Boys in 1979, Bators began a tumultuous relationship with Bomp! Records and its president, Greg Shaw.  According to Shaw: "[W]hat he craved most was to escape the fetters of his Dead Boy image and win respect as a singer of contemporary pop rock (...) in other words, he wanted to be 'the thinking punk's Eric Carmen.'" To this end, and usually with first-wave punk rock veterans in tow, he recorded several singles, many of which were unreleased, and an LP, Disconnected, which was released in 1980.  A retrospective album released in 1994, L.A. L.A. documented Bators' efforts as a pop-punk singer.

In 1980, Bators, located in London, formed The Wanderers with Dave Tregunna, the bass player for the punk group Sham 69, which had recently disbanded. The Wanderers came up with a concept album, called Only Lovers Left Alive (released in May 1981), along with two singles.

Bators and Tregunna formed The Lords of the New Church in 1981, with Brian James of The Damned. The Lords of the New Church became notorious for their live shows. A devotee of Iggy Pop, Bators had developed a fearless reputation in his Dead Boys days and continued such antics with The Lords of the New Church. They recorded two more successful albums.

Later, the punk vocalist gained additional exposure through more mainstream film. In 1981, Bators had a small role as "Bobo" in the satirical John Waters film Polyester. In 1988, Bators made a cameo appearance as "Dick Slammer", lead singer of the fictional band the Blender Children, in the offbeat comedy Tapeheads, starring John Cusack and Tim Robbins.

In summer 1985, Bators contributed backing vocals to "Sun City" by Artists United Against Apartheid and also appeared in its music video, shot in October.

The Lords of the New Church broke up in 1989, when Bators injured his back and guitarist Brian James secretly began advertising for a replacement singer.

Death 
In mid-1990, Bators died in Paris after being hit by a car. He was taken to a hospital but reportedly left before seeing a doctor after waiting several hours and assuming he was not injured. Reports indicate that he died in his sleep as the result of a traumatic brain injury.  He was survived by his parents.

Dave Tregunna said that Bators, a fan of Jim Morrison, had earlier requested that his ashes be spread over Morrison's Paris grave and his girlfriend complied.

In the director's commentary of the film Polyester, in which Bators had a small role, director/producer John Waters stated that Bators' girlfriend, Caroline Warren, confessed to him that she snorted a portion of Stiv's ashes so that she could be closer to him.

In film 
In 2013, an American-made motion picture titled CBGB was released to theaters. Dead Boys were featured as one of the seminal punk bands that got their start at the CBGB club, and were first managed by Hilly Kristal. Bators is portrayed by actor Justin Bartha.

In 2019, a biographical documentary was released titled Stiv. Directed and written by Danny Garcia, the film chronicles the life, legacy and demise of Bators.

Discography

With Dead Boys 

Studio albums

 Young, Loud and Snotty – 1977, Sire
 We Have Come for Your Children – 1978, Sire
 Younger, Louder and Snottier – 1997, Bomp! (Alternate mix album)
 3rd Generation Nation – 1999, Bad Boy Production (Alternate mix album)

With the Wanderers 

Studio albums

 Only Lovers Left Alive – 1981, Polydor

With The Lords of the New Church 

Studio albums

 The Lords of the New Church – 1982, Illegal, I.R.S.
 Is Nothing Sacred? – 1983, I.R.S.
 The Method to Our Madness – 1984, I.R.S.

Solo 

Studio albums

 Disconnected – 1980, Bomp!

Live albums

 Live at the Limelight – 1988, Perfect Beat (Germany, as Stiv Bators and His Evil Boys)

Compilation albums

 The Lord and the New Creatures – 1983, Lolita (France)
 I Wanna Be a Dead Boy... – 1992, Munster Records / Bomp!
 L.A. L.A. – 1993, Bomp!
 Sonic Reducer – 1994, Editions Atlas (France)
 The Last Race – 1996, Bond Age (France)
 L.A. Confidential – 2004, Bomp!
 Do You Believe In Magyk? – 2015, Easy Action (Reissue of The Last Race and Live at the Limelight)

Singles

 "It's Cold Outside" b/w "The Last Year" – 1979, Bomp!
 "Not That Way Anymore" b/w "Circumstantial Evidence" – 1980, Bomp!
 "Too Much To Dream" b/w "Make Up Your Mind" (12-inch) – 1980, Bomp!
 "Story in Your Eyes" b/w "Have Love Will Travel" – 1987, Bomp!
 "King of the Brats" b/w "Young Don't Cry" – 1995, Try To Understand (France, unofficial 7-inch – the B-side is a 1982 track by The Lords of the New Church)
 "Make Up Your Mind" b/w "Make Up Your Mind" – 2013, Ugly Pop Records (Canada, split 7-inch with David Quinton – the B-side is Quinton's 1981 solo version of the same song)

Extended Plays

 Last Stand 1980 EP – 2013, Ugly Pop Records (Canada, 7-inch, as Stiv Bators' Dead Boys – live recordings of "Son of Sam", "Third Generation Nation" and "All This and More")

Other appearances

 Various Artists: Where The Action Is!, 1980 – "Circumstantial Evidence" and "I'll Be Alright" (Promotional sampler from Bomp!)
 Artists United Against Apartheid: Sun City, 1985 – "Sun City" (Backing vocals)
 Tapeheads, 1988 – "Mr. MX7" (Stiv Bators with the Zeros; featured in the film but not included on the soundtrack album)
 Lyres: A Promise Is a Promise, 1988 – "Here's a Heart" (Guest vocals)
 Michael Monroe: Peace of Mind, 2000 – "I Wanna Be with You" and "It's a Lie" (Backing vocals; 1985 demo sessions)

References

Further reading 
Wolff, Carlo (2006). Cleveland Rock and Roll Memories. Cleveland: Gray & Company, Publishers. 
Chrome, Cheetah & Legs McNeil (2010). Cheetah Chrome: A Dead Boy's Tale From the Front Lines of Punk Rock. Minneapolis: Quayside Publishing Group, Voyageur Press, Publishers.

External links 
Stiv Bators
Stiv Bators Discography

1949 births
1990 deaths
American punk rock singers
American new wave musicians
Gothic rock musicians
Power pop musicians
Musicians from Youngstown, Ohio
Road incident deaths in France
20th-century American singers
The Lords of the New Church members
People from Girard, Ohio
Dead Boys members